All Around the World may refer to:

Music albums
 All Around the World (Jason Donovan album), or the title song
 All Around the World (Mindless Behavior album)
 "All Around the World", a 2007 album and music video by Ike Moriz

Songs
 "All Around the World" (Justin Bieber song), 2013
 "All Around the World" (The Jam song), 1977
 "All Around the World" (Little Willie John song), 1955
 "All Around the World" (Oasis song), 1998
 "All Around the World" (Paulina Rubio song), 2011
 "All Around the World" (Lisa Stansfield song), 1989
 "All Around the World", a song by Little Richard, the B-side of the 1956 single "The Girl Can't Help It"
 "All Around the World", a song by Ike Moriz, 2012
 "All Around the World", a song by Northern Line, 2000
 "All Around the World", a 2007 Lionel Richie song
 "All Around the World", a song used in the children's television series Fraggle Rock
 "All Around the World or the Myth of Fingerprints", a song by Paul Simon

Other uses
 All Around the World Productions, an English record label

See also
 Around the World (disambiguation)